Batterygate is a term used to describe deliberate processor slowdowns on Apple's iPhones, in order to prevent handsets with degraded batteries shutting down when under high load.

Critics argued the slowdown amounted to planned obsolescence, however this may stem from the common misconception that all older iPhones were slowed down. Some have argued that introducing a feature to prevent handsets with degraded batteries from rebooting is in fact the opposite of planned obsolescence since a slower non-rebooting phone would be preferable to the alternative.

Other criticism has come from the fact that the affected handsets were slowed down without explanation or other options provided to the user. Apple has since updated iOS to provide notifications and settings to allow users visibility of the throttling and even the ability to disable the throttling if the user prefers to have their phone reboot under high load. 

The controversy first emerged in late-2016, when it was reported that since a recent iOS update, some iPhone handsets had begun to experience unexpected shutdowns when their battery capacity reached 30%, caused by drops in the battery's terminal voltage below a threshold of around three volts required for operation of the device.

History
Upon the release of iOS 10.1.1 in late-2016, reports surfaced of battery usage issues with the update. There were also reports of device instability from some users on iPhone 6 and iPhone 6S models, including situations where the device would unexpectedly shut down once its battery capacity reached 30% (with one user having described the battery percentage as unexpectedly jumping down to 1% before doing so, but still appearing as 30% after the device was plugged in and rebooted). 

Apple confirmed in December 2016 that some iPhone 6S models manufactured in September and October 2015 had suffered from a battery manufacturing defect.

The company stated that this defect was not a safety concern, but that it could diminish capacity, and cause shutdowns to "protect [the device's] electronic components". In regards to other instances of shutdowns, Apple stated that it would include an "additional diagnostics capability" in the next iOS update so that it could "improve algorithms for managing battery performance and shutdown operations" in future versions. With the release of iOS 10.2.1 in February 2017, Apple stated that it had reduced unexpected shutdowns on iPhone 6S by "more than 80%", and by "over 70%" on iPhone 6. Apple also reported that these issues were separate from the aforementioned defects in the 6S. 

In December 2017, the developers of the benchmarking tool Geekbench issued a report which showed a pattern of performance degradation on iPhone 6 models upgraded past 10.2.1, and iPhone 7 models upgraded past iOS 11.2. There had been anecdotal evidence in the past that Apple had intentionally degraded the performance of older iPhone models on newer versions of iOS as a form of planned obsolescence, to encourage sales of newer models. 

In response to these reports, Apple issued a statement to CNET, confirming that it had implemented software performance controls based on battery health on older iPhone devices, in order to preserve system stability and prevent unexpected shutdowns. The company stated that its goal was to "deliver the best experience for customers, which includes overall performance and prolonging the life of their devices", and explained that "lithium-ion batteries become less capable of supplying peak current demands when in cold conditions, have a low battery charge or as they age over time, which can result in the device unexpectedly shutting down to protect its electronic components".

Soon afterward, Apple issued a formal apology, admitting that it initially believed that the issues were caused by iOS bugs and "normal, temporary" performance decreases following an update, but that "continued chemical aging" of batteries in older iPhone devices was also a factor. Apple stated that replacing the device's battery would restore full performance, and also announced that it would offer a US$50 discount (from $79 to $29) on battery replacements for iPhone 6 and 6S from January through December 2018, and that it would include more prominent battery health information in later versions of iOS. In January 2019, Apple CEO Tim Cook stated in a shareholder letter that over 11 million battery replacements had been made under the discount program. The company stated that it had never, nor would ever "do anything to intentionally shorten the life of any Apple product, or degrade the user experience to drive customer upgrades."

iOS 11.3 added the promised battery health information, and also allows these performance controls to be disabled.

Beginning with the iPhone 11, Apple introduced a new performance management system intended to "reduce performance impacts from battery aging". Unlike the previous system, this is always active in response to the battery's current capabilities, and there is no "peak performance" state.

Reception

USA Today columnist Jefferson Graham felt that Apple should have made the battery replacements be free, arguing that it "would go a long way towards erasing widespread suspicion that Apple purposely tries to make its older products obsolete in order to coax consumers into buying new ones."

As of January 2018, 32 class action lawsuits had been filed against Apple over this issue. A Chicago lawyer who proposed a $5 million class-action considered the battery discount "an insult to loyal customers who consistently and with much fanfare have flocked to Apple stores worldwide to purchase every version of the iPhone."

In January 2019, Apple CEO Tim Cook stated that the company had cut its earnings projections due to "fewer iPhone upgrades than we had anticipated", as well as lower-than-anticipated revenue in markets such as China.

On February 7, 2020, French consumer authorities fined Apple €25 million following a formal investigation into the decision. On February 28, 2020, Apple agreed to a $500 million settlement in a California court, under which it plans to pay at least $25 to all U.S. residents who had purchased an iPhone 6, 6 Plus, 6S, 6S Plus, SE, 7 or 7 Plus device .

A separate investigation from 34 states and the District of Columbia also looked into the battery practice. The investigation concluded in November 2020 with Apple and the states agreeing for Apple to pay a  fine related to throttling performance on the devices, and for Apple to issue documents to be transparent about how it throttles performance.

See also
 Antennagate
 Planned obsolescence
 Durapolist
 Vendor lock-in
 Criticism of Apple Inc.

References

External links

Apple Inc.
Battery (electricity)